The BTR-T (Russian: Бронетранспортёр-Тяжелый (Bronetransporter-Tyazhelyy), ‘Armoured Transporter–Heavy’)  was a Russian heavy APC (armored personnel carrier), designed by the Design Bureau of Transport Machine-Building (Omsktransmash) state-run production association.

Description
The vehicle is based on the hull of the T-55 tank and answers the need for a heavy, well protected and well armed vehicle adapted to urban combat. The need for a heavy APC appeared after the First Chechen War during which APCs like the BTR-80 were annihilated in urban areas at the hands of Chechen rebels using RPG shoulder-launched anti-tank weapons. Consequently, the design incorporates the T-55 tank's thick hull armor, with built-in Kontakt-5 reactive armour. It also has a bit "heavier" armament (similar to the BMP-2) with sufficient elevation to engage targets in multi-story buildings.

First appearance of this vehicle was in exhibition in Omsk in 1997. Due to lack of funding, the vehicle never had adequate testing and never entered service in the Russian military. There is no information about the number of vehicles converted. No export contracts have been signed.

Design
The choice of the T-55 hull rather than that of a more modern tank was decided on as an efficiency measure and also probably to validate a conversion for the many T-55s in use around the world. It was influenced by Israel's IDF Achzarit that created virtually the same modifications in the 1980s.

After removing T-55 gun and heavy turret, designers used a light, low-profile turret with a basket under it. The gunner was supposed to sit in that basket and rotate together with the turret. By removing stocks of 100 mm ammunition and using a space where empty shells were discarded inside the vehicle, designers made a space for five fully-equipped infantrymen (plus driver and gunner). That was not enough to make it a decent personnel carrier. With turret and armament similar to BMP-2 and 5+2 people inside, it turned out to be the first Russian heavy IFV rather than a heavy APC.

The roof plate of the hull was replaced with a new one that had four hatches for entering and leaving the vehicle. Frontal armor, side armor and roof plate were reinforced with Kontakt-5 ERA blocks. The side of the vehicle was reinforced with spaced armor and rubber side skirts. Armored fuel tanks were positioned in the rear of the vehicle. Floor armor plate was reinforced with anti-mine protection.

Armament
The turret can accommodate several weapon configurations:

 2A42 30 mm autocannon.
 9M113 Konkurs ATGMs.
 2A42 30 mm autocannon. 
 30mm AGS-17 automatic grenade launcher.
 Twin 2A38 30 mm autocannons.
 12.7×108 mm NSV heavy machine gun.
 9M113 Konkurs ATGMs.
 12.7×108 mm NSV heavy machine gun.
 30 mm AGS-17 automatic grenade launcher.

See also
 IDF Achzarit
 BMPT Terminator
 VIU-55 Munja
 BMPV-64: A Ukrainian heavy infantry combat vehicle based on the T-64 chassis.

References

 BTR-T Heavy Armored Personnel Carrier

Infantry fighting vehicles of Russia
Armoured fighting vehicles
Armoured fighting vehicles of the post–Cold War period
Tracked infantry fighting vehicles
Tracked armoured personnel carriers
Omsktransmash products